Nephrotoma flavescens is a species of fly in the family Tipulidae. It is found in the  Palearctic .

References

External links
Images representing Nephrotoma at BOLD

Tipulidae
Flies described in 1758
Nematoceran flies of Europe
Taxa named by Carl Linnaeus